DWAY (1332 AM) Sonshine Radio is the flagship AM station owned by Sonshine Media Network International. The station's studio and transmitter are located at Maharlika Highway, Brgy. Bitas, Cabanatuan.

References

Radio stations established in 1975
Radio stations in Nueva Ecija